Akhtar Colony is a neighborhood in Karachi West District in Karachi, Pakistan. It was previously administered as part of Jamshed Town. It was named after Muhammad Akhtar Qureshi by the people who loved him and his care for the people who lived in Defence Housing Authority for a long time.

There are several ethnic groups in Manzoor Colony and they include: Muhajirs, Punjabis, Sindhis, Kashmiris, Seraikis, Pakhtuns, Balochis, Memons, Bohras,  Ismailis. The population of Akhtar Colony is estimated to be nearly 100,000. Urdu is spoken in the neighborhood. Over 90% of the population is Muslim with small Christian and Hindu minorities.

In Akhtar Colony, there are five sectors A, B, C, D & E.

References

External links 
 Karachi website - Archived

Neighbourhoods of Karachi
Jamshed Town